Dar Sara (also Romanized as Dār Sarā; also known as Darisara and Torasara) is a village in Gil Dulab Rural District, in the Central District of Rezvanshahr County, Gilan Province, Iran. At the 2006 census, its population was 624, in 193 families.

References 

Populated places in Rezvanshahr County